Omorgus quadridens is a beetle of the family Trogidae.

References 

quadridens
Taxa named by Thomas Blackburn (entomologist)
Beetles described in 1892